Spartak Arturovich Gogniyev (born 19 January 1981) is a Russian professional football coach and a former player. He is the manager of FC Khimki.

Playing career
He made his debut in the Russian Premier League in 2000 for FC Dynamo Moscow. He played two games in the UEFA Cup 2000–01 for FC Dynamo Moscow and two games (scoring one goal) in the UEFA Champions League 2003–04 qualification round for PFC CSKA Moscow.

In August 2018, it was announced that Spartak Gogniyev joined new FC Urozhay Krasnodar, but this wasn't confirmed.

Coaching career
On 28 December 2018, he was appointed the head coach of FC Spartak Vladikavkaz. In July 2019, he moved from Spartak to the new club FC Alania Vladikavkaz.

On 2 September 2022, Gogniyev was hired by Russian Premier League club FC Khimki.

Personal life
His son Ruslan Gogniyev made his debut as professional footballer in 2019.

Honours
 Russian Premier League (1): 2003
 Russian Cup (1): 2002
 Russian First Division best striker: 2010
 Russian National Football League top scorer: 2012–13 (17 goals)

References

External links
 
 
 Profile by Russian Professional rusteam.permian.ru 

1981 births
Sportspeople from Vladikavkaz
Living people
Russian footballers
Association football forwards
Russia under-21 international footballers
Russia national football B team footballers
FC Dynamo Moscow players
PFC CSKA Moscow players
FC Rotor Volgograd players
FC Spartak Vladikavkaz players
FC Saturn Ramenskoye players
FC Rostov players
FC Kuban Krasnodar players
FC KAMAZ Naberezhnye Chelny players
FC Krasnodar players
Russian Premier League players
FC Ural Yekaterinburg players
Russian football managers
FC Spartak Vladikavkaz managers
FC Khimki managers
Russian Premier League managers